The 2017 Las Vegas Bowl was a college football bowl game played on December 16, 2017, at Sam Boyd Stadium in Whitney, Nevada. The twenty-sixth annual Las Vegas Bowl was one of the 2017–18 bowl games that concludes the 2017 NCAA Division I FBS football season. The game aired on ABC.

Team selection
The game featured teams from the Mountain West Conference and Pac-12 Conference. The representative from Mountain West was Boise State, who qualified for the bowl by winning the 2017 Mountain West Conference Football Championship Game. The Pac-12 representative was Oregon. This was Boise State's fourth trip to the Las Vegas Bowl, while it was Oregon's third.

This was the third meeting between the schools, with Boise State having won both previous meeting. The most recent prior meeting was on September 3, 2009, when the Broncos defeated the Ducks by a score of 19–8.

Boise State

Boise State finished the regular season 10–3 overall and 7–1 in Mountain West play, to finish in first place in the Mountain Division. They defeated Fresno State in the Mountain West Championship Game to become Mountain West champions.

Oregon

Oregon finished the regular season with a record of 7–5 overall and 4–5 in Pac-12 play, to finish in fourth place in the North Division. The Ducks were led by head coach Mario Cristobal after it was announced on December 5 that head coach Willie Taggart had accepted the head coaching position at Florida State.

Game summary

Scoring summary

Statistics

References

2017–18 NCAA football bowl games
2017
2017 Las Vegas Bowl
2017 Las Vegas Bowl
2017 in sports in Nevada
December 2017 sports events in the United States